The National Bank of Belgium (NBB; ,) has been the central bank of Belgium since 1850. It is a member of the European System of Central Banks and the Eurosystem. Until January 1999 when Belgium adopted the euro, the bank was responsible for the former national currency, the Belgian franc. 

The Governor of the National Bank is a member of the Governing Council, the main decision-making body of the Eurosystem, particularly as regards monetary policy; the National Bank of Belgium participates in the preparation and execution of its decisions.

Apart from monetary policy, the National Bank of Belgium takes on other tasks which can be classified as follows:
the issuance of euro banknotes
the printing of euro banknotes and the placing in circulation of euro coins
the management of foreign currency reserves 
the collection, circulation and analysis of economic and financial information 
the stability of the Belgian financial sector – see also CBFA
the role of financial ambassador to international economic institutions 
services for the Belgian State 
services for the Belgian financial sector 
services for the general public

50% of the NBB stock is freely traded on Euronext Brussels, the other 50% of the shares are owned by the Belgian government. (400.000 shares in total)

Governors 

 François-Philippe de Haussy (1850–1869)
 Eugène Prévinaire (1870–1877)
 André-Eugène Pirson (1877–1881)
 Alexandre Jamar (1882–1888)
 Eugène Anspach (1888–1890)
 Victor Van Hoegaerden (1891–1905)
 Théophile de Lantsheere (1905–1918)
 Leon Van der Rest (1918–1923)
 Fernand Hautain (1923–1926)
 Louis Franck (1926–1937)
 Georges Janssen (1938–1941)
 Albert Goffin (1941)
 Georges Theunis (1941–1944)
 Maurice Frère (1944–1957)
 Hubert Ansiaux (1957–1971)
 Robert Vandeputte (1971–1975)
 Cecil de Strycker (1975–1982)
 Jean Godeaux (1982–1989)
 Alfons Verplaetse (1989–1999)
 Guy Quaden (1999–2011)
 Luc Coene (2011–2015)
  (2015–2019)
  (2019–present)

Vice-Governors 
(List to be expanded)

 Luc Coene (2003–2011)
 Mathias Dewatripont (2014–2015)
 Pierre Wunsch (2015–2019)

See also

Belgian franc
Economy of Belgium
Euro
Jonathan-Raphaël Bisschoffsheim, founder and first President

References

External links

   
 The Scientific Library of the National Bank of Belgium
 

Economy of Belgium
Belgium
Belgium
Banks of Belgium
Companies in the BEL Mid Index
1850 establishments in Belgium
Banks established in 1850
Companies based in Brussels